Skrino Rocks (‘Skali Skrino’ \ska-'li skri-'no\) is the chain of rocks off the east coast of Robert Island in the South Shetland Islands, Antarctica, extending  in east–west direction.

The rocks are named after the settlement of Skrino in Western Bulgaria.

Location

British mapping in 1968 and Bulgarian in 2009.

See also 
 Composite Antarctic Gazetteer
 List of Antarctic and sub-Antarctic islands
 List of Antarctic islands south of 60° S
 SCAR
 Territorial claims in Antarctica

Map
 L.L. Ivanov. Antarctica: Livingston Island and Greenwich, Robert, Snow and Smith Islands. Scale 1:120000 topographic map.  Troyan: Manfred Wörner Foundation, 2009.

Notes

References
 Bulgarian Antarctic Gazetteer. Antarctic Place-names Commission. (details in Bulgarian, basic data in English)
 Skrino Rocks. SCAR Composite Gazetteer of Antarctica

External links
 Skrino Rocks. Copernix satellite image

Rock formations of Robert Island
Bulgaria and the Antarctic